Mystery shopping (related terms: mystery shopper, mystery consumer, mystery research, secret shopper and secret shopping and auditor) is a method used by marketing research companies and organizations that wish to measure quality of sales and service, job performance, regulatory compliance, or to gather specific information about a market or competitors, including products and services.

Mystery shoppers typically mirror common consumer behaviors to test the consistency of the habits deemed important to a specific brand or industry.  Mystery shoppers, who primarily operate as independent contractors or gig workers, submit detailed reports and feedback about their experiences.

Mystery shopping can take the form of physical visits to business premises, or calling companies to evaluate their customer experience often called mystery calling or Customer Experience Research Calling (CXR Calling).

Industries and common usage
Mystery shopping assessments and reports range from simple questionnaires to audio and video recordings. This type of market research can be used in any industry, from B2C and B2B, although B2B is rare. Mystery shoppers interact with and report on a wide range of businesses and services, including gas stations, automotive dealerships, transportation services, real estate and property management firms, movie theaters, health and fitness clubs, insurance products, roadside assistance, health care products and providers for both humans and pets, assisted living facilities, and funeral homes. However, the most common industries that utilize this research method are retail, hospitality and travel, restaurants and fast-food chains, banking, and e-commerce.

Growth
The mystery shopping industry had an estimated value of nearly $600 million in the United States in 2004, according to a 2005 report commissioned by the Mystery Shopping Providers Association (MSPA). Companies that participated in the report experienced an average growth of 11.1 percent from 2003 to 2004, compared to average growth of 12.2 percent. The report estimates that more than 8.1 million mystery shops were conducted in 2004. The report represents the first industry association attempt to quantify the size of the mystery shopping industry. The Independent Mystery Shoppers' Coalition reports there are 1.5 million mystery shoppers in the United States alone. Similar surveys are available for European regions where mystery shopping is becoming more embedded into company procedures.

As a measure of its importance, customer/patient satisfaction is being incorporated more frequently into executive pay. A study by a U.S. firm found more than 55% of hospital chief executive officers surveyed in 2005 had "some compensation at risk," based on patient satisfaction, up from only 8% to 20% a dozen years ago." In the United Kingdom, a Mystery Shoppers Practitioners' Group has been established under the auspices of the Market Research Society.

Additionally, since 2010, mystery shopping has become abundant in the medical tourism industry, with healthcare providers and medical facilities using the tool to assess and improve the customer service experience.

A 2011 survey by American Express found a clear correlation between a company's attention to customer service and customers' willingness to pay more for good service.

CBC Television's news magazine program Marketplace ran a segment on this topic during a January 2001 episode.

Ethics 
Mystery shopping organizations advise that their research should only be used for employee incentive programs and that punishment or firing is an inappropriate use of mystery-shopper data. However, stories of employees being fired as a direct result of negative mystery shopper feedback are not uncommon.

The Trade Organization for Mystery Shopping Providers, MSPA has defined a Code of Professional Standards and Ethics Agreement for Mystery Shopping Providers and for Mystery Shoppers. Other organizations that have defined standards for Mystery Shopping are ESOMAR, MRS and MRA. The most widely used set of professional guidelines and ethics standards for the Market Research industry is ISO.

In the state of Nevada, mystery shoppers must be licensed by the PILB board and work under a company that has a private investigators license in order to perform mystery shopping jobs. Unlicensed mystery shoppers may face fines. 

In June 2008, the American Medical Association's Council on Ethical and Judicial Affairs released a recommendation on the use of "secret shopper patients". The Recommendation: "Physicians have an ethical responsibility to engage in activities that contribute to continual improvements in patient care. One method for promoting such quality improvement is through the use of secret shopper 'patients' who have been appropriately trained to provide feedback about physician performance in the clinical setting." However, in 2009, the council decided to withdraw the report "in light of further testimony heard at the 2008 Interim Meeting [of the AMA House of Delegates]".

Research 
When used in published research, mystery shopping is known as a simulated patient research methodology.  The Checklist for reporting research using simulated patient methodology (CRiSP) should be used when reporting these research.

UK Examples
The UK government's Crown Commercial Service operated a mystery shopper scheme from February 2011 to November 2018, whose remit was to provide a route for suppliers to raise concerns about public procurement practice in England. The service was re-branded as the "Public Procurement Review Service" in November 2018 responding to feedback from suppliers and public bodies that the "mystery shopper" title did not properly reflect the role of the service. Section 40 of the Small Business, Enterprise and Employment Act 2015 created a statutory basis for some aspects of the review service.

Also in the UK, mystery shopping is increasingly used by local authorities, and other non-profit organizations such as housing associations and churches, to provide feedback on user satisfaction.

See also
List of confidence tricks § Mystery shopping
Marketing research
Observational techniques
Participant observation

References

Market research
Distribution (marketing)
Surveillance